Noureddine Madjhoud (born 24 December 1975) is an Algerian boxer. He competed at the 1996 Summer Olympics and the 2000 Summer Olympics.

References

External links
 

1975 births
Living people
Algerian male boxers
Olympic boxers of Algeria
Boxers at the 1996 Summer Olympics
Boxers at the 2000 Summer Olympics
Place of birth missing (living people)
African Games medalists in boxing
AIBA World Boxing Championships medalists
Featherweight boxers
21st-century Algerian people
African Games gold medalists for Algeria
Competitors at the 1999 All-Africa Games
20th-century Algerian people